Wrestling at the 2019 Military World Games was held in Wuhan, China from 21 to 24 October 2019.

Medal summary

Men's freestyle

Men's Greco-Roman

Women's freestyle

Medal table

References

External links
Wrestling at the 7th Military World Games
Results book

Wrestling
2019
Military World Games